National Portrait Gallery may refer to:

National Portrait Gallery (Australia), in Canberra
National Portrait Gallery (Sweden), in Mariefred
National Portrait Gallery (United States), in Washington, D.C.
National Portrait Gallery, London, with satellite galleries in North Yorkshire and Somerset, England
Scottish National Portrait Gallery, in Edinburgh

See also 
Portrait Gallery
NPG (disambiguation)